Kalaage Haqqugaa is a Maldivian romantic drama television series developed for Television Maldives by Fathimath Nahula. The series stars Niuma Mohamed, Ali Ahmed, Ali Seezan, Jamsheedha Ahmed, Sheela Najeeb, Aminath Rasheedha and Ali Shameel in pivotal roles.

Premise
Hassan (Ali Seezan) and Hussain (Ali Ahmed) are the only children of Faiz (Ali Shameel) and Waheedha (Aminath Rasheedha). The couple is revealed that Hussain is a thalassemia carrier. The non-identical twins grew up with an orphan, Imna (Niuma Mohamed) who stays at their house, Faiz's business partner, Anwar's (Roanu Hassan Manik) only daughter, Nuzu (Jamsheedha Ahmed later played by Sheela Najeeb) and Zeena (Nashidha Mohamed), a neighbor. Nuzu and Hassan marries while Imna and Hussain's secret love affair is being exposed to Waheedha by Zeena, who secretly is in love with Hussain. Imna is expelled from the house in a desperate act by Nuzu to frame Imna having a secretive relationship with their guest, Zubair (Ahmed Saeed). Hussain follows Imna and cuts off the ties with his family and decides to marry her.

Hassan leaves to HDh. Kulhudhuffushi to join Hussain and Imna on their wedding while he dies when the boat he was travelling capsizes into the sea. The whole family is traumatized on hearing the news of grief. Faiz requests Hassan to stay with them for around five months. Afterwards, to strengthen the family relations and to honor Hassan's memory, Waheedha arranges Hussain and Nuzu's marriage.

Cast and characters

Main
 Niuma Mohamed as Aishath Imna
 Ali Ahmed as Hussain
 Ali Seezan as Hassan (3 episodes)
 Jamsheedha Ahmed as Nuzu (7 episodes)
 Sheela Najeeb as Nuzu (6 episodes)
 Aminath Rasheedha as Waheedha as Hussain's mother
 Ali Shameel as Faiz; Hussain's father

Recurring
 Roanu Hassan Manik as Anwar; Nuzu's father
 Nashidha Mohamed as Zeena
 Ahmed Saeed as Zubair
 Aminath Shareef as Zeena's mother
 Chilhiya Moosa Manik as Habeeb; Imna's uncle
 Arifa Ibrahim as Habeeb's wife

Guest
 Hassan Haleem as a Radio Journalist
 Ali Shahid as a dancer in the song "Veynaa Udhaahaa"

Soundtrack

References

Serial drama television series
Maldivian television shows